Gwangju National University of Education (also Kwangju National University of Education  광주교육대학교) is a national university located in Buk-gu, Gwangju, South Korea. It is one of ten national universities that are designed to raise high-quality elementary school teachers. On average incoming students at the national education university have a 95th percentile of the national college entrance exam. Its origins lie in the Chonnam Public Teachers School founded in 1923. In 1961 this became the Gwangju Teachers College running a two-year teacher training programme. In 1993 it became the Gwangju National University of Education and runs four year teacher training programmes. Starting in 1996 it has also run a graduate school.

International Relationships
In 1995, Gwangju National University Education establishes a sisterhood relationship with Naruto University of Education in Japan. The university expands the international relationships with University of Pittsburgh (1997. 5. 1), University of Illinois at Chicago (1998. 3. 23), and University of South Africa (1998. 7. 20).

See also
List of national universities in South Korea
List of universities and colleges in South Korea
Education in Korea

References

External links 
  
  

National universities of education in South Korea
Universities and colleges in Gwangju
Educational institutions established in 1938
1938 establishments in Korea